Cape Bering is a cape on the southwest coast of the Chukchi Peninsula, washed by Bering Sea in the Providensky District of the Chukotka Autonomous Okrug in Russia.

Enmelen (lit. "craggy" in Chukchi) is situated near Cape Bering.

References

Bering
Landforms of the Bering Sea

Providensky District